Estradiol disulfate (also known as E2DS or estradiol 3,17β-disulfate) is an endogenous estrogen conjugate and metabolite of estradiol. It is related to estradiol 3-sulfate and estradiol 17β-sulfate. Estradiol disulfate has 0.0004% of the relative binding affinity of estradiol for the estrogen receptor alpha (ERα), one of the two estrogen receptors (ERs).

See also
 Catechol estrogen
 Estrogen conjugate
 Lipoidal estradiol
 List of estrogen esters § Estradiol esters

References

Estradiol esters
Human metabolites
Phenol esters
Sulfate esters